Pararaneus is a genus of orb-weaver spiders first described by Lodovico di Caporiacco in 1940.

Species
 it contains five species:
Pararaneus cyrtoscapus (Pocock, 1898) – Central, East, Southern Africa, Socotra
Pararaneus perforatus (Thorell, 1899) – Central, East, Southern Africa
Pararaneus pseudostriatus (Strand, 1908) – Central, East Africa
Pararaneus spectator (Karsch, 1885) – Africa, Middle East
Pararaneus uncivulva (Strand, 1907) – Madagascar

References

Araneidae
Araneomorphae genera
Spiders of Africa
Spiders of Asia